Mycomicrothelia is a genus of fungi within the Arthopyreniaceae family.

References

External links 
 Mycomicrothelia at Index Fungorum

Pleosporales
Dothideomycetes genera